The 2012 UEFA Europa League Final was the final match of the 2011–12 UEFA Europa League, the 41st season of Europe's secondary club football tournament organised by UEFA (after the UEFA Champions League), and the 3rd season since it was renamed from the UEFA Cup to the UEFA Europa League. The match was played on 9 May 2012 at the Arena Națională in Bucharest, Romania, and was contested between two Spanish sides – Atlético Madrid and Athletic Bilbao. The match ended with Atlético Madrid winning 3–0, with Radamel Falcao scoring two goals and Diego scoring another. In doing so, Falcao was named man of the match, and became the first player to win back-to-back Europa League titles with different teams.

The winners earned the right to play against Chelsea, the winners of the 2011–12 UEFA Champions League, in the 2012 UEFA Super Cup.

Venue

The Arena Națională was announced by UEFA as the venue of the 2012 final on 30 January 2010. This was the first final of a European football club competition hosted by Romania.

The stadium was built on the site of the former national stadium, and opened on 6 September 2011 with a UEFA Euro 2012 Group D qualifier match between Romania and France.

Background

This was the second consecutive Europa League final contested by two teams from the same nation, and the ninth time overall (including UEFA Cup). The only other all-Spanish final of UEFA's second club competition was the 2007 UEFA Cup Final, when Sevilla defeated Espanyol. That was also the last final before the 2019 UEFA Europa League Final, where both finalist teams had played only in the UEFA Cup/Europa League in their routes to the final (rather than dropping down from the UEFA Champions League, either after the early knockout rounds or after the group stage).

Both teams have played in one previous Europa League/UEFA Cup final. Atlético Madrid won the first Europa League final after its renaming in 2010, beating Fulham 2–1 after extra time. Athletic Bilbao lost in 1977 to Juventus on away goals after the tie finished 2–2 on aggregate. The two teams have never met in European competition before. They have met each other in three Copa del Rey finals, with Athletic Bilbao winning two and Atlético Madrid winning one. In the 2011–12 La Liga season, Athletic Bilbao won their home fixture 3–0 and Atlético Madrid won their home fixture 2–1.

After losing to Udinese on 20 October 2011, Atlético Madrid went on a run of 11 straight victories to the final, a record in European football, winning their remaining group games to top their group and then defeating four knockout opponents both home and away.

Road to final

† As a result of match-fixing allegations, Turkish club Fenerbahçe were removed from the 2011–12 UEFA Champions League and were replaced with Trabzonspor on 24 August 2011. As a result, Trabzonspor's second leg against Athletic Bilbao was cancelled, and Athletic Bilbao advanced to the group stage.

Pre-match

Ticketing

The two finalist teams received 9,000 tickets each for distribution to their supporters. 20,000 tickets have been sold to local football fans with a further 3,000 tickets available for sale to fans worldwide via UEFA.com, with prices between 100 RON and 500 RON. The remaining tickets are allocated to the local organising committee, UEFA's 53 national football associations, and commercial and broadcast partners.

Officials
In May 2012, German referee Wolfgang Stark was appointed for the final. Joining him were fellow German officials Mike Pickel and Jan-Hendrik Salver as assistant referees, Deniz Aytekin and Florian Meyer as additional assistant referees, Mark Borsch as reserve assistant referee, and French official Stéphane Lannoy as fourth official.

Ambassador
Former Romanian player Miodrag Belodedici was named as the ambassador for the final.

Match

Details

Statistics

See also
1921 Copa del Rey Final
1956 Copa del Generalísimo Final
1985 Copa del Rey Final
2011–12 UEFA Europa League
2012 UEFA Champions League Final
2012 UEFA Super Cup
Athletic Bilbao in European football
Atlético Madrid in European football
Spanish football clubs in international competitions

References

External links
2011–12 UEFA Europa League, UEFA.com
2012 final: National Stadium, Bucharest, UEFA.com

International club association football competitions hosted by Romania
2012
Final
UEFA
Sports competitions in Bucharest
Athletic Bilbao matches
Atlético Madrid matches
UEFA
May 2012 sports events in Europe
21st century in Bucharest